The Diamond Queen is a 1953 American adventure film directed by John Brahm. It stars Fernando Lamas and Arlene Dahl.

Plot
Adventurer and gem expert Jean Baptiste Tavernier promises a diamond to cap King Louis XIV's crown for the coronation, but the reckless haste of the king's emissary, Baron Paul de Cabannes, causes the jewel to be cut badly and ruined.

Jean volunteers to travel to India to bring back another worthy stone. Cabannes insists on coming along and complicates the journey more than once before saving Jean's life and earning his respect.

The men are caught leering at a lovely woman bathing in a waterfall and are taken prisoner by her men. She is Queen Maya of Nepal. In the temple, Jean and Cabannes learn of the Eye of the Goddess, a rare blue diamond. It is in the possession of the Mogul of Golconda, who promises to give it to Queen Maya as a wedding gift, but secretly plans to take rule of her country.

With the use of a new "secret weapon," a prototype of hand grenade, the Frenchmen are able to overcome the Mogul's men in battle. The queen offers to give them the diamond, so in return they invite her to Louis's coronation.

Cast
Fernando Lamas as Jean Baptiste Tavernier
Arlene Dahl as Queen Maya
Gilbert Roland as Baron Paul de Cabannes
Sheldon Leonard as Mogul
Jay Novello as Gujar, Maya's steward

References

External links

1953 films
Films directed by John Brahm
Cinecolor films
Films set in India
Films set in Paris
Films set in the 17th century
Warner Bros. films
1950s historical adventure films
American historical adventure films
Films scored by Paul Sawtell
1950s English-language films
1950s American films